Eddy Djadjang Djajaatmadja (born 1928 or 1929) is an Indonesian army officer and bureaucrat who served as the mayor of Central Jakarta from 1966 until 1979 and as the acting governor of Central Sulawesi from 1979 until 1980.

Military career 
Djajaatmadja was appointed as the spokesperson to the Commander of the Jakarta Military Region at that time, Umar Wirahadikusumah. During his tenure as spokesperson, Djajaatmadja was involved in a controversy between him and the Communist Party of Indonesia when he accused several members of the party's politburo of wrongdoings in a statement announced on 22 July 1959. The party's politburo sent a letter to the Jakarta's military court three days later, stating that Djajaatmadja has defamed the party and demanded him to be tried in the military court.

At the National Awakening Day celebrations held on 20 May 1959, Djajaatmadja announced that Jakarta residents who did not hoist the Indonesian flag during the day were given warning. He stated that actions would be taken against the residents if they failed to hoist the flag for the second time.

Djajaatmadja was transferred to hold command as the Commander of the Tangerang Military District. He still held the position after the reorganization of military districts in Jakarta in 1966. He left the position after he was appointed as the Mayor of Jakarta a month later.

Mayor of Jakarta 

Djajaatmadja became the Mayor of Central Jakarta on 26 August 1966 and continued to held office for another thirteen years. During his tenure, Djajaatmadja was involved in the development of pencak silat martial arts organization. He was initially elected as the chairman of the Jakarta's pencak silat organization in 1978 before becoming the daily chairman of the central pencak silat organization. He was later replaced as daily chairman by Eddie Marzuki Nalaparya after ending his mayoral term and due to frequent health complications.

Governor of Central Sulawesi 
Djajatmadja was sworn in as the acting governor of Central Sulawesi on 22 October 1979 after his predecessor, Moenafri, was ousted due to alleged disloyalty to the central government. He refused to live in the official governor's residence and lived in the guest house as a governor. During his governorship, the province's annual budget increased sharply from twenty-five billion rupiahs to fifty-four billion rupiahs.

Several riots occurred in Central Sulawesi as an aftermath of Moenafri's removal. A group of students clashed and damaged the house of several Central Sulawesi bureaucrats. The students later demanded the removal of regional secretary B. L. Sallata from his office. Djajaatmadja refused to fulfill the demands, stating that he had been instructed by the Minister of Home Affairs not to remove any of the Central Sulawesi bureaucrats from their offices for the time being.

Djajaatmadja's acting term ended after he handed over his office to acting governor Eddy Sabara. The newspaper Tempo rumored that Djajaatmadja was removed due to his inability in organizing an election for a definitive governor. Djajaatmadja denied the allegations, stating that the matter was handled by the province's parliament and not by him.

References 

Mayors and regents of places in Jakarta
Mayors of places in Indonesia
Governors of Central Sulawesi
Indonesian civil servants
1920s births
Living people